Emilie Sofie Hesseldal (born 21 December 1990) is a Danish professional basketball player and a member of the Danish national basketball team. She won the Danish championship in 2021 as a member of BMS Herlev Wolfpack and in 2022 as a member of AKS Falcon, being named the Finals MVP both years. During her career, she has won both the Danish Cup, in 2010 with Aabyhøj IF and 2022 with AKS Falcon, and the Icelandic Cup, in 2020 with Skallagrímur.

A strong rebounder, Hesseldal has led the Danish Dameligaen, the Spanish Liga Feminina de Basquetebol and the Icelandic Úrvalsdeild kvenna in rebounds.

Playing career

First years (2006–2012)
Hesseldal started her career with Aabyhøj IF in the Dameligaen during the 2006–2007 season. During her second season, she had broken into the starting lineup. She led the league in steals in 2010 and 2011. In 2012, Hesseldal transferred to Horsholm 79ers where she appeared in two games, averaging 25.0 points and 9.0 rebounds, before moving to college in the United States.

College years (2012–2016)
Hesseldal started her college career with Eckerd College in 2012. In 16 games with the Tritons, she averaged 9.8 points, 5.3 rebounds, 2.8 assists and 2.0 steals per game.

After the season, she transferred to Colorado State. In December 2014, Hesseldal dislocated her left elbow and completely tore her ulnar collateral ligament (UCL). After missing a month, she played through the injury for the remaining of the season and despite requiring a Tommy John surgery to repair the damage, she decided to forgo the surgery prior to her senior season as it would've ended her college career.

Post college (2016–2018)
After graduating from college, Hesseldal took a year off from basketball. She returned to the court with Stevnsgade BBK prior to the 2017-2018 season and helped the team reach the Dameligaen finals where the club lost to Horsholm 79ers in five games.

Vitoria SC (2018–2019)
Hesseldal signed with Liga Feminina de Basquetebol club Vitória S.C. for the 2018–2019 season where she went on to average 11.2 points and league leading 12.2 rebounds per game.

Iceland (2019–2020)
In September 2019, Hesseldal signed with Skallagrímur of the Icelandic Úrvalsdeild kvenna.
 On 22 November she scored 32 points and grabbed 14 rebounds in a victory against Haukar. On 15 February 2020, Hesseldal helped Skallagrímur win the Icelandic Basketball Cup for the first time, defeating KR in the cup finals.

Back in Denmark (2020–present)
Hesseldal signed with Danish team BMS Herlev for the 2020–2021 season. The season ended with BMS winning the Danish championship and Hesseldal receiving the finals MVP award. In 19 league games she averaged 12.5 points, 10.3 rebounds, 3.7 assists and a league leading 3.1 steals per game.

Prior to the 2021–2022 season, Hesseldal signed with newly formed AKS Falcon, a joint team of Ajax København Sportsgymnasium (AKS) and Falcon Basketball. In April 2022, she won the Danish championship and was named the Finals MVP for the second straight season after Falcon swept SISU in the Dameligaen finals. In the championship game, she posted 28 points and 28 rebounds. For the season, she averaged 18.1 points, 16.9 rebounds, 5.5 assists, 3.2 steals and 1.5 blocks and was named the leagues MVP.

Statistics

College statistics

Source

References

External links
Icelandic statistics at Icelandic Basketball Association
Danish statistics at kvindebasketligaen.dk
Colorado State profile
Eckerd College profile

1990 births
Living people
Centers (basketball)
Colorado State Rams women's basketball players
Emilie Hesseldal
Danish expatriate basketball people in the United States
Danish women's basketball players
Hørsholm 79ers players
Power forwards (basketball)
Emilie Hesseldal
Emilie Hesseldal
Sportspeople from Aarhus
21st-century Danish women